Alfredo Palacio Moreno (Loja, August 9, 1912 – Guayaquil, April 20, 1998) was an Ecuadorian sculptor and painter.

He was the director of the Municipal School of Fine Arts in Guayaquil for 32 years. He was the father of the former Ecuadorian President Alfredo Palacio González (in office 2005-2007) and son of Manuel Belisario Moreno, who was known for writing the novel Naya o La Chapetona.

He was awarded the national prize Premio Eugenio Espejo for his art in 1993 by the President of Ecuador.

References 

Ecuadorian sculptors
1912 births
1998 deaths
People from Loja, Ecuador
20th-century sculptors
20th-century Ecuadorian painters